Microsoft Dynamics 365 is a product line of enterprise resource planning (ERP) and customer relationship management (CRM) intelligent business applications announced by Microsoft in July 2016 and released on November 1, 2016. It was formerly Microsoft Dynamics.

Applications 
Microsoft Dynamics is largely made up of products developed by companies that Microsoft acquired: Dynamics GP (formerly Great Plains), Dynamics NAV (formerly Navision; now forked into Dynamics 365 Business Central), Dynamics SL (formerly Solomon), and Dynamics AX (formerly Axapta; now forked into Dynamics 365 Finance and Operations).  The various products are aimed at different market segments, ranging from small and medium-sized businesses (SMBs) to large organizations with multi-language, currency, and legal entity capability. In recent years Microsoft Dynamics ERP has focused their marketing and innovation efforts on SaaS suites.

Microsoft Dynamics 365 contains 12 applications:

Dynamics 365 SalesSales Leaders, Sales Operations
Dynamics 365 Customer ServiceCustomer Service Leaders, Customer Service Operations
Dynamics 365 Field ServiceField Service Leaders, Field Service Operations
Dynamics 365 Human ResourceAttract, Onboard, Core HR
Dynamics 365 Finance & OperationsFinance Leaders, Operation Leaders
Dynamics 365 Supply Chain Management - Streamline planning, production, stock, warehouse, and transportation.
Dynamics 365 Commerce
Dynamics 365 Project Service AutomationOperation Leaders, Project Leaders
Dynamics 365 Marketing—Adobe Marketing Cloud, Dynamics 365 for Marketing
Dynamics 365 Artificial IntelligenceAI for Sales, AI for Customer Service, AI for Market Insight
Dynamics 365 Mixed RealityRemote Assist, Layout, Guides
Dynamics 365 Business CentralERP for SMBs

Microsoft Dynamics 365 for Finance and Operations

Microsoft Dynamics 365 for Finance and Operations Enterprise Edition (formerly Microsoft Dynamics AX)  ERP and CRM software-as-a-service product meant for mid-sized and large enterprises. Integrating both Dynamics AX and Dynamics CRM features, consisting of the following modules: for Financials and Operations, for Sales Enterprise, for Marketing, for Customer Service, for Field Service, for Project Service Automation. Easily connected with Office 365 and PowerBI.

Microsoft Dynamics AX
Microsoft Dynamics AX was one of Microsoft's enterprise resource planning software products. In 2018, its thick-client interface was removed and the web product was rebranded as Microsoft Dynamics 365 for Finance and Operations as a part of  the Dynamics 365 suite. MDCC or Microsoft Development Center Copenhagen was once the primary development center for Dynamics AX. Microsoft Dynamics AX contained 19 core modules:

Traditional core (since Axapta 2.5)
General Ledger – ledger, sales tax, currency, and fixed assets features
Bank Management – receives and pays cash
Customer Relationship Management (CRM) – business relations contact and maintenance (customers, vendors, and leads)
Accounts Receivable – order entry, shipping, and invoicing
Accounts Payable – purchase orders, goods received into inventory
Inventory Management – inventory management and valuation
Master Planning (resources) – purchase and production planning
Production – bills of materials, manufacturing tracking
 Store, manage, and interpret data.

Extended core
The following modules are part of the core of AX 2009 (AX 5.0) and available on a per-license basis in AX 4.0:
Shop Floor Control
Cost Accounting
Balanced Scorecards
Service Management
Expense Management
Payroll Management
 Environmental Management

MorphX and X++

X++ integrates SQL queries into standard Java-style code. The following three examples produce the same result, though the first has generally better performance. Samples 2 and 3 hint at an object-like behavior from table buffers.

Sample #1
/// <summary>
/// This job is used as an X++ sample
/// </summary>
public static void xppTest1(Args _args)
{ 
    UserInfo userInfo;

    ttsBegin;
    update_recordset userInfo
    setting enable = NoYes::No
    where userInfo.id != 'Admin'
    && userInfo.enable;
    ttsCommit;
}

Sample #2
/// <summary>
/// This job is used as an X++ sample
/// </summary>
public static void xppTest2(Args _args)
{
    UserInfo userInfo;

    ttsBegin;
    while select forupdate userInfo
    where userInfo.id != 'Admin'
    && userInfo.enable
    {
        userInfo.enable = NoYes::No;
        userInfo.update();
    } 
    ttsCommit;
}

Sample #3
/// <summary>
/// This job is used as an X++ sample
/// </summary>
public static void xppTest3(Args _args)
{
    UserInfo userInfo;

    ttsBegin;
    select forupdate userInfo
    where userInfo.id != 'Admin'
    && userInfo.enable;
    while (userInfo)
    {
        userInfo.enable = NoYes::No;
        userInfo.update();
        next userInfo;
    }
    ttsCommit;
}

Presence on the Internet
Information about Axapta prior to the Microsoft purchase was available on technet.navision.com, a proprietary web-based newsgroup, which grew to a considerable number of members and posts before the Microsoft purchase in 2002.

After Microsoft incorporated Axapta into their Business Solution suite, they transferred the newsgroup's content to the Microsoft Business Solutions newsgroup. The oldest Axapta Technet post that can be found dates to August 2000.

Events
Extreme Conferences: extreme365 is a conference for the Dynamics 365 Partner Community which now includes Dynamics AX, featuring an Executive Forum.

Personalization and predictive analytics
At the National Retail Federation (NRF) Conference 2016 in New York, Microsoft unveiled its partnership with Infinite Analytics, a Cambridge-based predictive analytics and personalization company.

Microsoft Dynamics 365 Business Central

Microsoft Dynamics 365 Business Central (formerly Microsoft Dynamics NAV)  ERP and CRM software-as-a-service product meant for small and mid-sized businesses. Integrating both Dynamics NAV and Dynamics CRM features, consisting of the following modules: for Financials and Operations, for Sales Professionals, for Marketing. Easily connected with Office 365 and PowerBI.
Microsoft Dynamics 365 Customer Engagement (formerly Microsoft CRM). Microsoft Dynamics 365 Customer Engagement contains modules to interact with customers: Marketing, Sales, Customer Service, Field Service. The Customer Service is a module used to automate customer service processes providing performance data reports and dashboards. It gives access to several modules such as direct chat, social channels, or live visual support like ViiBE.

Online & On-Premises Deployment 
The Dynamics 365 Business Central system comes in both an online hosted (SaaS) version and an on-premises version for manual deployment and administration.

Some features, such as integration with other online Microsoft services, aren't available in the on-premises version and only in the online edition.

Localization 
As an international ERP system, Business Central is available with 24 official localizations to work with the local features and requirements of various countries. Local partners provide an additional 47  localizations.

The system is compliant with various internal financial standards to meet local requirements, such as GDPR, IAS/IFRS and SOX.

Editions & Licensing 
There are two editions of Business Central, Essentials and Premium. Essentials covers Finance, Sales, Marketing, Purchasing, Inventory, Warehousing, and Project Management. Premium includes all of Essentials functionality plus Service Management and Manufacturing features.

With the arrival of NAV 2013, Microsoft introduced a new licensing model that operated on a concurrent user basis. With this model, user licenses were of two types: A full User or a Limited User. The full user has access to the entire system, whereas the limited user only has read access to the system and limited write access. 

From the Business Central rebrand launch, the licensing model changed to a per-seat license model with a 3x concurrent seat multiplier added to any existing perpetual licences from previous Dynamics NAV versions. Customers with a Dynamics NAV Extended Pack license were moved to the Premium edition.

Microsoft Dynamics 365 Sales

Microsoft Dynamics 365 Sales is a customer relationship management software package developed by Microsoft. The current version is Dynamics 365. The name and licensing changed with the update from Dynamics 2016.

History
Microsoft Dynamics was a line of Business Applications, containing enterprise resource planning (ERP) and customer relationship management (CRM). Microsoft marketed Dynamics applications through a network of reselling partners who provided specialized services.  Microsoft Dynamics formed part of "Microsoft Business Solutions". Dynamics can be used with other Microsoft programs and services, such as SharePoint, Yammer, Office 365, Azure and Outlook. The Microsoft Dynamics focus-industries are retail, services, manufacturing, financial services, and the public sector. Microsoft Dynamics offers services for small, medium, and large businesses.

Business Central
Business Central was first published as Dynamics NAV and Navision, which Microsoft acquired in 2002.

Navision 
Navision originated at PC&C A/S (Personal Computing and Consulting), a company founded in Denmark in 1984. PC&C released its first accounting package, PCPlus, in 1985—a single-user application with basic accounting functionality. There followed in 1987 the first version of Navision, a client/server-based accounting application that allowed multiple users to access the system simultaneously. The success of the product prompted the company to rename itself to Navision Software A/S in 1995.

The Navision product sold primarily in Denmark until 1990. From Navision version 3 the product was distributed in other European countries, including Germany and the United Kingdom.

In 1995 the first version of Navision based on Microsoft Windows 95 was released.

In 2000, Navision Software A/S merged with fellow Danish firm Damgaard A/S (founded 1983) to form NavisionDamgard A/S. In 2001 the company changed its name to "Navision A/S".

On July 11, 2002, Microsoft bought Navision A/S to go with its previous acquisition of Great Plains Software. Navision became a new division at Microsoft, named Microsoft Business Solutions, which also handled Microsoft CRM.

In 2003 Microsoft announced plans to develop an entirely new ERP system (Project Green). But it later decided to continue development of all ERP systems (Dynamics AX, Dynamics NAV, Dynamics GP and Dynamics SL). Microsoft launched all four ERP systems with the same new role-based user interface, SQL-based reporting and analysis, SharePoint-based portal, Pocket PC-based mobile clients and integration with Microsoft Office.

Dynamics NAV 
In September 2005, Microsoft re-branded the product and re-released it as Microsoft Dynamics NAV.

In December 2008, Microsoft released Dynamics NAV 2009, which contains both the original "classic" client, as well as a new .NET Framework-based three-tier GUI called the RoleTailored Client (RTC).

In first quarter of 2014 NAV reached 102,000 current customers.

In 2016, Microsoft announced the creation of Dynamics 365 — a rebranding of the suite of Dynamics ERP and CRM products as a part of a new online-only offering.  As a part of this suite, the successor to NAV was codenamed "Madeira".

Dynamics 365 Business Central 
In September 2017 at the Directions conference, Microsoft announced the new codename 
"Tenerife" as the next generation of the Dynamics NAV product. This replaced codename "Madeira".

On April 2, 2018, Business Central has released publicly and plans for semi-annual releases were announced.

Business Central introduced a new AL language for development and translated the codebase from Dynamics NAV (C/AL).

Dynamics SL, Dynamics GP, Dynamics C5 
Several variants of the Dynamics brand have migration paths to Business Central with most having not had a new release since 2018. The later releases of the SL, GP, and C5 products adopted the Dynamics NAV Role-Tailored Client UI which helped pave the transition to the Business Central product.

History of Dynamics C5 
Dynamics C5 was developed in Denmark as the successor to the DOS-based Concorde C4. The developing company Damgaard Data merged with Navision in 2001 which was subsequently acquired by Microsoft Microsoft in 2002 rebranding the solution from Navision C5 to Microsoft Dynamics C5.

The product handles currently more than 70,000 installations in Denmark.

History of Dynamics SL 

Based in Findlay, Ohio, Solomon's roots go back more than 35 years, when co-founders Gary Harpst, Jack Ridge and Vernon Strong started TLB, Inc. in 1980. TLB, Inc. stands for The Lord's Business. TLB was named to remind the founders why the business was started: to conduct the business according to biblical principles. TLB was later renamed Solomon Software, and then Microsoft Dynamics SL.

History of Dynamics GP 
The Dynamics GP product was originally developed by Great Plains Software, an independent company located in Fargo, North Dakota run by Doug Burgum. Dynamics Release 1.0 was released in February 1993. It was one of the first accounting packages in the United States that were designed and written to be multi-user and to run under Windows as 32-bit software. In late 2000, Microsoft announced the purchase of Great Plains Software. This acquisition was completed in April 2001.

Dynamics GP is written in a language called Dexterity. Previous versions were compatible with Microsoft SQL Server, Pervasive PSQL, Btrieve, and earlier versions also used C-tree, although after the buyout all new versions switched entirely to Microsoft SQL Server databases.

Finance
Microsoft Dynamics 365 Finance is a Microsoft enterprise resource planning (ERP) system for medium to large organisations. The software, part of the Dynamics 365 product line, was first on general release in November 2016, initially branded as Dynamics 365 for Operations. In July 2017, it was rebranded to Dynamics 365 for Finance and Operations. At the same time, Microsoft rebranded their business software suite for small businesses (Business Edition, Financials) to Finance and Operations, Business Edition, however, the two applications are based on completely different platforms. Its history includes:
 1998 (March) - Axapta, a collaboration between IBM and Danish Damgaard Data, released in the Danish and U.S. markets.
 2000 - Damgaard Data merged with Navision Software A/S to form NavisionDamgaard, later named Navision A/S. Released Axapta 2.5. IBM returned all rights in the product to Damgaard Data shortly after the release of Version 1.5.
 2002 - Microsoft acquires Navision A/S. Released Axapta 3.0.
 2006 - Released Microsoft Dynamics AX 4.0.
 2008 - Released Microsoft Dynamics AX 2009.
 2011 - Released Microsoft Dynamics AX 2012. It was made available and supported in more than 30 countries and 25 languages. Dynamics AX is used in over 20,000 organizations of all sizes, worldwide.
 2016 - Released Microsoft Dynamics AX 7. Later rebranded to Dynamics 365 for Operations. This update was a major revision with a completely new UI delivered through a browser-based HTML5 client, and initially only available as a cloud-hosted application. This version lasted only a few months, though, as Dynamics AX was rebranded Microsoft Dynamics 365 for Operations in October 2016, and once more as Dynamics 365 for Finance and Operations in July 2017.
 2017 - Rebranded to Dynamics 365 for Finance and Operations, Enterprise Edition (not to be mistaken with Dynamics 365 for Finance and Operations Business Edition, which is based on former Microsoft Dynamics NAV).
 2018 - Rebranded to Dynamics 365 for Finance and Operations
 2018 - The Human Resources Module became Dynamics 365 for Talent, now Dynamics 365 Human Resources. 
 2020 - Rebranded and split into two products: 
 Dynamics 365 Finance
 Dynamics 365 Supply Chain Management

Sales

Microsoft Dynamics 365 Sales has undergone several iterations over its history.

Microsoft CRM 1.2 
Microsoft CRM 1.2 was released on December 8, 2003. Microsoft CRM 1.2 was not widely adopted by industry. 

It was not possible to create custom entities but there was a software development kit (SDK) available using SOAP and XML endpoints to interact with it.

Microsoft Dynamics CRM 3.0 
The second version was rebranded as Microsoft Dynamics 3.0 (version 2.0 was skipped entirely) to signify its inclusion within the Dynamics product family and was released on December 5, 2005.
Notable updates over version 1.2 are the ease of creating customizations to CRM, the switch from using Crystal Reports to Microsoft SQL Reporting Services, and the ability to run on Windows Vista and Outlook 2007. 

Significant additions released later by Microsoft also allowed Dynamics CRM 3.0 to be accessed by various mobile devices and integration with Siebel Systems. This was the first version that saw reasonable take up by customers. 

You could create custom entities and (1xN) relations between the system/custom entities.

Microsoft Dynamics CRM 4.0 
Dynamics CRM 4.0 (a.k.a. Titan) was introduced in December 2007 (RTM build number 4.0.7333.3 Microsoft CRM build numbers from version 4.0 to version 8). It features multi-tenancy, improved reporting security, data importing, direct mail merging and support for newer technologies such as Windows Server 2008 and SQL Server 2008 (Update Rollup 4).

Dynamics CRM 4.0 also implements CRM Online, a hosted solution that is offered directly by Microsoft. The multi-tenancy option also allows ISVs to offer hosted solutions to end customers as well.

Dynamics CRM 4.0 is the first version of the product, which has seen significant take up in the market and passed the 1 million user mark in July 2009.

Additional support for NxN relations was added, which solved a lot of 'in-between' entities. "Connections" were also introduced in favour of "Relations". The UI design was based on Office 2007 look and feel, with the same blue shading and round button as "start".

Microsoft Dynamics CRM 2011 
Dynamics CRM 2011 was released to open Beta in February 2010. It then went into Release Candidate stage in December 2010. The product was then released in February 2011 (build number 5.0.9688.583)

Browsers such as Internet Explorer, Chrome and Firefox browsers are fully supported since Microsoft Dynamics CRM 2011 Update Rollup 12. Because of this browser compatibility R12 was highly anticipated but also caused a lot of stress for customers that had used unsupported customizations. R12 broke those customizations and clients had to rethink their changes. Microsoft offered additional wizards to pinpoint the problems.

Microsoft Dynamics CRM 2013 
Dynamics CRM 2013 was released to a closed beta group on the 28th of July 2013. Dynamics CRM 2013 Online went live for new signups in October 2013. It was released in November 2013 (build number 6.0.0000.0809).

Microsoft Dynamics CRM 2015 
On September 16, 2014, Microsoft announced that Microsoft Dynamics CRM 2015, as well as updates to its Microsoft Dynamics CRM Online and Microsoft Dynamics Marketing services, will be generally available in the fourth quarter of 2014. Microsoft also released a preview guide with details.

On November 30, 2014, Microsoft announced the general availability of Microsoft Dynamics CRM 2015 and the 2015 Update of Microsoft Dynamics Marketing.

On January 6, 2015, Microsoft announced the availability of a CRM Cloud service specifically for the US Government that is designed for FedRAMP compliance.

Microsoft Dynamics CRM 2016 
Microsoft Dynamics CRM 2016 was officially released on November 30, 2015. Versions for CRM 2016 was 8.0, 8.1 and 8.2. With version 8.2 the name, Microsoft Dynamics CRM 2016, was changed to Dynamics 365

Microsoft Dynamics CRM 2016 was officially released on November 30, 2015. It includes advancements in intelligence, mobility and service, with significant productivity enhancements. In June 2016 was developed a special application which sends scanned info from business cards into MS Dynamics CRM named Business Card Reader for MS Dynamics and Call Tracker application in 2017.

Microsoft Dynamics 365 Sales 
Microsoft Dynamics 365 was officially released on November 1, 2016, as the successor to Dynamics CRM. The product combines Microsoft business products (CRM and ERP Dynamics AX).

The on-premises application, called Dynamics 365 Customer Engagement contained the following applications:
 Dynamics 365 for Sales 
 Dynamics 365 for Customer Service
 Dynamics 365 for Marketing
 Dynamics 365 for Field Service
 Dynamics 365 for Project Service Automation

The offerings Dynamics 365 for Finance and Operations cover the ERP needs, such as bookkeeping, invoice and order handling and manufacturing.

In Dynamics 365 version 9.0.0.1 many notable features like Virtual entities in Dynamics 365, Auto Numbering Attributes, Multi Select Options sets etc. were introduced.

Product updates

October 2018 update 
The update released in October 2018 included new features for sales, marketing, customer service, and recruitment.

April 2019 update 
This update was released on April 5, 2019. The features added after the update, included a user interface (UUI) to embed canvas apps created in PowerApps and it also brought back the tabs facility. The update also led to the removal of the Xrm.Page.data.

February 2020 update 
An update was announced on February 19, 2019. The update included additions to the Customer Insights, Microsoft's customer data platform (CDP) such as new first and third-party data connections. In addition to this, this update brought forth new sales forecasting tools and Dynamics 365 Sales Engagement Center. The Dynamics 365 Project Operations was introduced in this update.

October 2021 update (Wave 1) 
An update was announced on October 5. 2019. This update included a replacement of bank reconciliation reports. The payment reconciliation journal was improved to support preview posting, separate number series, and user-defined documents numbers. Microsoft Dynamics 365 also welcomes Correct Dimensions action. With this update, Microsoft Dynamics 365 has welcomed integration with Microsoft Teams search box, Microsoft Word, and Microsoft Universal Print technology.

Support & End of life

Related products
Microsoft Dynamics includes a set of related products:

 Microsoft Dynamics Management Reporter. Management Reporter is a financial reporting and analysis application. Its main feature is to create income statements, balance sheet statements, cash flow statements and other financial reports. Reports can be stored in a centralized Report Library along with external supporting files. Security on reports and files may be controlled using Windows Authentication and SQL Server.
 Microsoft Dynamics for Retail (formerly Microsoft Dynamics RMS, QuickSell 2000 and Dynamics POS)
 Microsoft Dynamics for Marketing (formerly MDM and MarketingPilot 2012)
 Microsoft Dynamics Social Listening (formerly Netbreeze 2013)
 Power Automate, formerly Microsoft Flow (until 2019), a toolkit similar to IFTTT for implementing business workflow products.
 Power Automate Desktop, a robotic process automation software for automating graphical user interfaces (acquired in May 2020)
 Parature customer engagement software in the customer support and service channels (acquired in January 2014)

Microsoft also sells Sure Step as an implementation methodology for Microsoft Dynamics for its re-sellers.

In July 2018, Microsoft announced Dynamics 365 AI for sales applications.

See also
Microsoft Azure
Microsoft Dataverse
Microsoft Office
Microsoft Power Platform
List of Microsoft software

References

Further reading

External links
 
 Microsoft Dynamics AX 2012 Launches Worldwide
 Microsoft Dynamics 365 for Finance and Operations official webpage

Accounting software
American companies established in 2016
Cloud applications
ERP software
Microsoft cloud services
360